Jaisak is a village of Mandi Bahauddin District in the Punjab province of Pakistan, It is located at 32°31'06.1"N 73°36'22.6"E . Jaisak is situated 16 km east of the city of Mandi Bahauddin, 11 km north of the city of Phalia and 17.5 km south of the town of Chillianwala. A major canal flows near the town, which is known as Rasul-Qadir Abad Link Canal. The population of the village is about 5,000 and the number of registered voters in the village is about 1,200.

Neighbouring Villages and Towns 
Helan is 6 km east side of Jaisak, village Adhi Sharif is 6.2 km to the west, Saharan 6.3 km and Chillianwala  17.5 km in the north, Qila Atar Singh 2 km and Phalia 11 km on the south of Jaisak.

Means Of Earning  
The majority of people earn their livelihood through agriculture. There are some who are working as government employees, mostly army, and police. Many young people are residing abroad to earn and support their families like in the USA, France, South Africa, Spain, Sweden, Greece, Italy, Salalah-Muscat (Oman), Kuwait, Saudi Arabia, and Dubai.

Way of Living 
People of the village live a simple life. They go to their land to care for their cattle and crops and come back in the evening. Young boys play cricket, volleyball, and kabaddi.

Schools and colleges 
The literacy rate of the village is relatively high. Almost every child from the village goes to school. There are three main schools in the village:
  Government primary school for boys
  Government middle school for girls
 Shahid Model Private School

Approximately 500 students are studying in these schools.

Masjids 
There are six mosques in the village:
 Ghousia Masjid (Jaamia) جامع غوثیہ مسجد
 Faizan-e-Madina Masjid فیضانِ مدینہ مسجد
 Ya Ali Masjid یا علی مسجد 
 Madni Masjid (Jaamia) جامع مدنی مسجد
 Faisal Masjid فیصل مسجد
 Hazrat Bilal Masjid حضرت بلال مسجد

Hospitals and Health Facilities  
There is no hospital in the village, but one clinic run by a health-related servant. The village has some health workers, creating awareness particularly about pregnancy and birth-related problems. Generally, people get minor health services from the town of Chourand and major services from Mandi Bahauddin city.

Shopping 
There are no bazaars or markets in the village, but there are many general stores (Karyana shops) that provide commodities for daily use. People go to Mandi Bahauddin city or Phalia city for major shopping.

Transportation 
The village is located almost 16 km southeast from the city Mandi Bahauddin. People of the village travel on Vans from main Jaisak chowk or the village's own bus stop. Cars and Motorcycles are very common in the village.

Main Crops and Fruits 
The land of the village is very fertile and many crops can be grown. Major crops include
 Wheat گندم
 Rice چاول
 Sugarcane گنا
 Potato آلو
 Sweet pea مٹر
 Chickpea چنا
 Barley جو
 Alfalfa لوسرن
 Sorghum جوار
 Maize مکئی
 Tobacco تمباکو
 Trifolium alexandrinum برسیم

Media and Communication 
In the village, Television, radio, PTCL phones and Mobile phones are present in almost every house. People in the village also possess Computers and use the Internet.

Buildings 
 Gurudwara Kair Bawa a historical building is present in the village. Sikhs left this ancient building in 1947 at the time of independence of Pakistan.

There are no shrines or tombs in the village.

Canal
There is one very famous canal Rasul-Qadir Abad Link Canal near the village.

References

Union councils of Mandi Bahauddin District
Villages in Mandi Bahauddin District